is a Japanese professional footballer who plays forward for FC Gifu in the J3 League.

Career statistics
Updated to 23 February 2018.

1Includes J2/J3 relegation play-offs.

References

External links 

 Profile at V-Varen Nagasaki
Profile at Kamatamare Sanuki

1987 births
Living people
Osaka Gakuin University alumni
Association football people from Okayama Prefecture
Japanese footballers
J2 League players
J3 League players
Japan Football League players
Roasso Kumamoto players
V-Varen Nagasaki players
Kamatamare Sanuki players
Giravanz Kitakyushu players
FC Gifu players
Association football midfielders